DXRS (105.7 FM), broadcasting as 105.7 Radyo Natin, is a radio station owned by Manila Broadcasting Company and operated by Goodluck Radio Network. The station's studio and transmitter are located at Radyo Natin Bldg., Gundaya Ext, Brgy. 19, Gingoog.

References

Radio stations established in 1997
Radio stations in Misamis Oriental